Melitulias is a genus of moths in the family Geometridae described by Edward Meyrick in 1891. All are found in Australia.

Species
Melitulias graphicata (Walker, 1861)
Melitulias leucographa Turner, 1922
Melitulias oriadelpha Turner, 1926
Melitulias glandulata (Guenée, 1857)
Melitulias discophora Meyrick, 1891

References

Hydriomenini